The Lois and Doug Mitchell U Sports Athletes of the Year Awards, formerly known as the Lieutenant Governor Athletic Awards, Borden Ladner Gervais (BLG) Awards, and Howard, Mackie Awards, are given annually to top male and female athletes in Canadian universities that are members of U Sports. Each of the 56 member schools nominate a female and male athlete of the year which are further narrowed down to representatives from each of the four athletics conference of U Sports (Atlantic University Sport, Canada West Universities Athletic Association, Ontario University Athletics, and Réseau du sport étudiant du Québec). The eight nominees each receive a commemorative durilium ring and the two winners receive $10,000 post-graduate scholarships and are awarded the Doug and Lois Mitchell Trophy. The nominees must have participated in their sport for at least two years and cannot win the award more than once.

History 
The awards were founded in 1993 by Douglas Mitchell who wanted to provide more recognition for Canadian university athletes. They were initially named after Mitchell's law firm Howard, Mackie in Calgary, Alberta. After a merger of law firms in 2000, the awards were renamed the BLG Awards after the new law firm Borden Ladner Gervais. The awards were further rebranded as the Lieutenant Governor Athletic Awards in 2019 while continuing to be championed by Mitchell and his wife, Lois Mitchell, the 18th Lieutenant Governor of Alberta. The women's winner was awarded the Jim Thompson Trophy as of 2003 and the men's winner was awarded the Doug Mitchell Trophy as of 2009. Starting in 2020, both winners are awarded Doug & Lois Mitchell Trophies while the Jim Thompson Trophy is now given to a distinguished alumni beginning in 2021. The awards were rebranded again in 2021 as the Lois and Doug Mitchell U Sports Athletes of the Year Awards.

List of past winners

References

External links 
 Official website

Canadian sports trophies and awards
Annual sporting events in Canada
1993 establishments in Canada